Edward Dorr Tracy, Jr. was a brigadier general of the Confederate States Army during the American Civil War. After serving in Virginia and Eastern Tennessee, he was killed at the Battle of Port Gibson which was part of the Vicksburg Campaign.

Biography

Tracy was born in Macon, Georgia on November 5, 1833. Prior to the war, he was a lawyer. He moved to Huntsville, Alabama in the late 1850s.

At the start of the Civil War, he was a captain for a company in the 4th Alabama Infantry Regiment. The regiment fought at the First Battle of Bull Run. On October 12, 1861, Tracy was appointed lieutenant colonel of the 19th Alabama Infantry Regiment and was transferred to the Western Theater. He had a horse killed under him at the Battle of Shiloh. He was commissioned as a brigadier general on August 16, 1862.

Tracy was killed at the Battle of Port Gibson, Mississippi on May 1, 1863. He was buried at Rose Hill Cemetery in Macon, GA.

See also

List of American Civil War generals (Confederate)

Notes

References
 Eicher, John H., and David J. Eicher, Civil War High Commands. Stanford: Stanford University Press, 2001. .
 .
 .

External links
 
 General Edward Door Tracy, Jr. historical marker

1833 births
1863 deaths
People from Macon, Georgia
People of Georgia (U.S. state) in the American Civil War
Confederate States Army brigadier generals
Confederate States of America military personnel killed in the American Civil War
People of Alabama in the American Civil War